Cemochechobee Creek is a stream in the U.S. state of Georgia. It is a tributary to the Chattahoochee River.

Cemochechobee is a name derived from the Muskogean language meaning "sand-big". Variant names include "Cemocheckobee Creek", "Cemocheechobee Creek", "Cemocheehobbee Creek", "Comochechabbee Creek", and "Comochechebbee Creek".

References

Rivers of Georgia (U.S. state)
Rivers of Clay County, Georgia
Rivers of Randolph County, Georgia